The Tanzania women's national basketball team represents Tanzania in international competitions. It is administrated by Tanzania Basketball Federation (TBF).

See also
 Tanzania women's national under-19 basketball team

References

External links
Tanzania Basketball Records at FIBA Archive
Tanzania Basketball at Afrobasket.com

Women's national basketball teams
Basketball
Basketball in Tanzania
Basketball teams in Tanzania